Carl David Harry (born October 26, 1967) is a former American football wide receiver in the National Football League for the Washington Redskins and for the Las Vegas Posse of the Canadian Football League. He played college football at the University of Utah.

References

1967 births
Living people
American football wide receivers
Players of American football from California
Sportspeople from Orange County, California
People from Fountain Valley, California
Las Vegas Posse players
Utah Utes football players
Washington Redskins players